St Mark's Church is located in Westfield, Woking, England. The church is in the Parish of the South Woking Team Ministry and the Diocese of Guildford.

History
St Mark's Church was originally built as part of a school for two hundred pupils. In 1924, the building became a known as 'The Mission', until in 1970, the church adopted its current name. The church is unconsecrated, although eighty worshippers could comfortably fit into St Mark's.

References

Woking
Woking
Diocese of Guildford